The Union of Textile, Clothing and Leather Workers (GTBL) was a trade union representing workers in a variety of related industries in Austria.

The union was founded in 1945 by the Austrian Trade Union Federation.  Its membership fell over the years, and by 1998, was only 18,439.  In 2000, it merged with the Union of Metal, Mining and Energy, to form the Metal Textile Union.

Presidents
1945: Michael Frühwirth
1958:(?)
1984: Harald Ettl

References

Textile and clothing trade unions
Trade unions established in 1945
Trade unions disestablished in 2000
Trade unions in Austria
1945 establishments in Austria
2000 disestablishments in Austria